The Ministry of Science and Education of Croatia ( or MZO) is the ministry in the Government of Croatia which is in charge of primary, secondary and tertiary education, research institutions and sports. However, the fact that both education and sports are governed by one single body had drawn criticism from long time Croatian educators, which have the view of having the Ministry focusing on education alone.

List of ministers
The ministry in its current form came into existence in 2003 in the Cabinet of Ivo Sanader I, resulting from the merger of the earlier Ministry of Science and Technology and the Ministry of Education and Sports. Both ministries had been originally formed in 1990, although they had changed forms and names several times during the 1990s. Below are lists of ministers of who headed both portfolios before the 2003 merger.

Ministers of Science (1990–2003)
From 1990 to 1992 the first three ministers held the title of Minister of Science, Technology and Informatics. In August 1992 the ministry was renamed Ministry of Science and Technology, which remained unchanged until 2003.

Ministers of Education (1990–2003)
Between 1990 and 1993 the ministry was called Ministry of Education, Culture and Sports. In April 1993 it was renamed Ministry of Culture and Education. In October 1994 the ministry was split into the present-day Ministry of Culture and Ministry of Education and Sports (with Ljilja Vokić appointed as head of the latter). This form remained unchanged until 2003.

Ministers of Science, Education and Sports (2003–2016)

Ministers of Science and Education (2016–present)

Notes
 nb 1.  Milena Žic-Fuchs was appointed in 1999 as a non-party minister within the cabinet quota of HDZ.
nb 2.  Dragan Primorac was originally appointed as a non-party minister in December 2003 in the HDZ-dominated Sanader cabinet. While in office he formally joined HDZ in September 2007. In July 2009 he resigned from his ministerial post to run in the December 2009 presidential election as an independent candidate. Because of his decision not to endorse HDZ's official party candidate Andrija Hebrang, his party membership was rescinded in November 2009.
nb 3.  Vedran Mornar was appointed in 2014 as a non-party minister within the cabinet quota of SDP.

References

External links
Official website 

Science
Croatia
Croatia
Croatia